Eden is an unincorporated community in Ohio County, West Virginia, United States. It lies at an elevation of 797 feet (243 m).

References

Unincorporated communities in Ohio County, West Virginia
Unincorporated communities in West Virginia